Shams al-Muluk Gamil al-Baroudi is a retired Egyptian actress who was active in Egyptian films and also Lebanese films during the 1960s and 1970s. Lisa Anderson of the Chicago Tribune described her as "one of the most beautiful and glamorous of Egypt's actresses".

Career
She was born to an Egyptian father and a Syrian mother  who was born in Egypt, al-Baroudi studied at the Higher Institute of Dramatic Arts in Cairo for two and a half years and made her cinema debut in Ismail Yassin's comedy Hired Husband (زوج بالإيجار) in 1961. After a prolific career in the 1960s, she came under spotlight with "transgressive" roles in early 1970s, such as her role in Salah Zulfikar's psychological drama The Other Man (الرجل الآخر) in 1973 and Malatily Bathhouse (حمام الملاطيلي) of Salah Abu Seif in 1973.

After marriage to fellow actor Hassan Youssef in 1972, the couple started to work in cooperation until al-Baroudi decided after Umrah in 1982 to quit cinema and wear the hijab. At that time Youssef was still filming Two on the Road (اثنين على الطريق) and after al-Baroudi's unexpected retirement, the film could only be completed and released by 1984.

After retirement
In 2001, Nourah Abdul Aziz Al-Khereiji of the Arab News interviewed al-Baroudi in the 2001 Al-Madinah Festival. Al-Baroudi described her acting era as "the time of ignorance," the name Muslims use to refer to the pre-Islamic era. As of 2004, she was wearing a niqab and her sole television appearances were on religious satellite channels. By 2008, she stopped wearing the niqab and only wore the veil.

Lisa Anderson used al-Baroudi as an example of an increase in social conservatism in Egyptian society.

Personal life
Al-Baroudi married Saudi prince Khalid bin Saud in 1969, and divorced after 13 months. Since 1972, she is married to actor Hassan Youssef. One of their sons, Omar H. Youssef is also an actor. Her niece, Ghada Adel is also an actress.

Filmography

See also

 Cinema of Egypt

References
 Habib, Samar. Female Homosexuality in the Middle East: Histories and Representations. Routledge, July 18, 2007. , 9780415956734.

Notes

External links
 
 Rizq, Hamdi (حمدى رزق) "Shams Al-Baroudi." (Archive) Translated from Arabic to English by Eltorjoman International. Almasry Alyoum. Saturday 22 March 2008. Issue 1378. Original Arabic: "شمس الملوك." (Archive)
 "Actress Shams al-Baroudy releases a statement concerning her husband actor Hassan Youssif." (Archive) Elcinema.com. DAMLAG S.A.E.

Living people
Egyptian film actresses
1945 births
People from Giza Governorate
Egyptian people of Syrian descent
Egyptian Sunni Muslims
20th-century Egyptian actresses